Stonely is a hamlet next to Kimbolton  in Cambridgeshire, England. It is part of the parish of Kimbolton and Stonely. The hamlet was formerly the site of the Augustinian Stonely Priory. Stonely is designated as a conservation area. It has 17 listed buildings, including Kimbrook House and Stonely Grange.

References

Hamlets in Cambridgeshire
Kimbolton, Cambridgeshire